Picloram is a systemic herbicide used for general woody plant control. It also controls a wide range of broad-leaved weeds, but most grasses are resistant.  A chlorinated derivative of picolinic acid, picloram is in the pyridine family of herbicides.

Picloram can be sprayed on foliage, injected into plants, applied to cut surfaces, or placed at the base of the plant where it will leach to the roots. Once absorbed by the foliage, stem, or roots, picloram is transported throughout the plant.

Herbicides containing picloram are sold under a variety of brand names. Dow Chemicals and now Dow AgroSciences sell herbicides containing it under the brand name Tordon.

During the Vietnam War,  picloram and other herbicides were combined to make Agent White (commercially available as Tordon 101) and enhanced Agent Orange, which was previously conducted by the British military during the Malayan Emergency. Large quantities of these herbicides were sprayed by U.S. forces in areas where they considered its long-term persistence desirable, such as inland forests.

Safety
Picloram is of moderate toxicity to the eyes and only mildly toxic on the skin. No history of human intoxication by picloram has been documented, so symptoms of acute exposure are difficult to characterize.

Picloram is the most persistent of its family of herbicides. It does not adhere to soil, so may leach to groundwater, and has in fact been detected there. It is degraded in soil and water mainly by microbes. Picloram has very little tendency to accumulate in aquatic life.

Gardeners who use dung as fertilizer should check to make certain that the animal source has not grazed on picloram-treated hay, as the dung still has broadleaf-killing potency.

In regards to occupational exposures, the U. S. Occupational Safety and Health Administration has established a permissible exposure limit of 15 mg/m3 total exposure and 5 mg/m3 for respiratory exposure, over an eight-hour workshift.

References

External links 
 

Auxinic herbicides
Chloropyridines
Aminopyridines
Carboxylic acids
Herbicides